Paris By Night 94: 25th Anniversary is a Paris By Night program produced by Thúy Nga that was filmed at the Terrace Theater at the Long Beach Convention and Entertainment Center on September 20, 2008.

The program is the first part of a 2-part program produced by Thúy Nga to celebrate the 25th anniversary of the reestablishment of Thúy Nga overseas.

Track list

Disc 1

 Vũ Khúc Paris Và Hãy Cho Tôi Ngày Mai – Quỳnh Vi, Như Loan, Dương Triệu Vũ, Trịnh Lam, Lương Tùng Quang, Minh Tuyết, Bảo Hân, Hồ Lệ Thu & Celina Linh Thy
 Tình Nghèo – Ngọc Hạ & Quang Lê
 Suối Lệ Xanh – Họa Mi
 Ngợi Ca Quê Hương Em – Hương Thủy
 Bản Tình Ca Cho Em – Bằng Kiều
 Em Phải Làm Sao – Thủy Tiên
 Liên Khúc The Final Countdown – Trizzie Phương Trinh, Lynda Trang Đài & Tommy Ngô
 Tân Cổ: Kiếp Cầm Ca – Phượng Liên & Phi Nhung
 Niệm Khúc Cuối – Elvis Phương & Khánh Ly
 Diễm Xưa – Don Hồ
 Đừng Trách Sáo Sang Sông – Hà Phương
 Mãi Mãi Không Ân Hận – Lương Tùng Quang

Disc 2

 Skit: Thế Giới Huyền Bí – Chí Tài, Hoài Linh & Uyên Chi
 Đêm Đông – Nguyễn Hưng
 Liên Khúc: Hãy Cho Tôi & Con Tim Mù Lòa – Nguyễn Huy Thần Đồng
 7000 Đêm Góp Lại – Hương Lan
 Anh Đi Chiến Dịch – Thanh Tuyền
 Thinking Of You – Bảo Hân & Tú Quyên
 Mùa Đông Của Anh – Thế Sơn & Hương Giang
 Như Chiếc Que Diêm – Quang Dũng
 Đã Không Còn Hối Tiếc – Minh Tuyết
 Áo Em Chưa Mặc Một Lần & Vòng Nhẫn Cưới – Mai Thiên Vân & Quang Lê
 Liên Khúc: Lời Yêu Thương – Duy Quang, Đức Huy, Tuấn Ngọc & Thái Châu
 Nếu Có Yêu Tôi – Khánh Hà
  Bonus MTV: Ngàn Năm Vẫn Ðợi – Như Loan

Paris by Night
vi:Paris By Night 94